In the 1977–78 season West Ham United were relegated from the First Division after twenty years in the top flight since their promotion in 1958.

Season summary
Despite winning six of their last nine League matches, they paid the price for a terrible start to the season that had seen them win just one of their first twelve games, and were relegated when they lost their last match to Liverpool and Wolverhampton Wanderers beat Aston Villa. They finished one point behind Queens Park Rangers and went down to the Second Division alongside Newcastle United and Leicester City. They also suffered a heavy 6–1 defeat to QPR in the FA Cup, equalling their record margin of defeat in the competition at that time.

A season of few highlights saw the introduction to the first team of Alvin Martin and David Cross, both of whom went on to play significant parts in the club's revival in subsequent seasons.

League table

Results

Football League First Division

FA Cup

League Cup

Players

References

1977-78
English football clubs 1977–78 season
1977 sports events in London
1978 sports events in London